The badge of the British Leeward Islands was adopted in the 1870s.

The Royal arms on the top of the badge was a non-classical design.

A coat of arms was adopted in 1909. The arms combined the devices used on the public seals of each of the colony's presidencies, with Antigua and Dominica in chief, St Kitts and Nevis in the fess point, and Montserrat and the Virgin Islands in base. The crest was a pineapple.

See also
Coat of arms of the British Windward Islands

External links

British Overseas Territories coats of arms
Coats of arms of former countries
Caribbean culture
British Leeward Islands